Newton railway station is a railway station located between the neighbourhoods of Drumsagard, Halfway, Newton and Westburn in the town of Cambuslang (Greater Glasgow), Scotland. The station is managed by ScotRail on the Argyle and Cathcart Circle Lines.

History
The original Newton station was opened as part of the Clydesdale Junction Railway on 1 June 1849. The station also served the Hamilton Branch of the Caledonian Railway. It closed on 19 December 1873 and a new station was opened  due west on the same day. The station later served trains to and from the Glasgow Central Railway and the Lanarkshire and Ayrshire Railway, though neither route survived beyond the mid 1960s – the GCR route via  closed on 5 October 1964, whilst the L&AR ceased to carry passenger traffic through to the coast as long ago as 1932, with complete closure beyond  following in December 1964.

Station information

Newton is also the location of a junction between the West Coast Main Line and the Argyle/Cathcart Circle routes; it is at this point Argyle Line services leave the West Coast Main Line en route to the Hamilton Circle. This junction was the location of the Newton rail crash in 1991 when four people were killed and 22 injured.

The extant platforms are located on the former slow lines through the station. The fast line platforms were removed at the time of the Cathcart Circle electrification. To the west of the station the lines from the Cathcart Circle are joined by a link line from the WCML. To the east of the station the line splits with one line heading southeast on the Hamilton circle, and link line heading towards  on the WCML. This link line also contains a turnback siding. At the time of its opening, all Argyle Line trains towards Uddingston and Bellshill stopped at Newton. Since the 1990/91 remodelling Argyle Line trains toward Bellshill no longer stop at the station. Shotts Line services via  and Intercity services pass the station on the main lines. The 2010/11 service had most  trains passing through the station without stopping.

Improvements at Newton station made around 2013 include the installation of a passenger footbridge with lifts and the expansion of the car park which now contains approximately 250 places.

There is a small cairn located at the drop-off zone of the station car park erected by Pride Of Place community environmental programme in memory of the workers of the large Hallside Steelworks which was located immediately to the south of the station. Another similar memorial cairn organised by Pride Of Place is on Gilbertfield Road, Cambuslang, commemorating the soldiers from the area who marched the route to Newton station in order to go off to war.

The three bridges (unused, WCML, local) over Newton Station Road just west of the station were refurbished over the course of four months in 2021, at a cost of £800,000 – the station remained in operation but the access road was closed to all vehicles.

Stages of electrification and subsequent layout changes 
British Railways undertook major railway electrification in the Greater Glasgow Area in the 1960s which was continued by British Rail with the West Coast Main Line into the 1970s.

The Slow line platforms were electrified as part of the 1962 Cathcart Circle scheme through to  via the West Coast Main Line. The fast line platforms were taken out of use at this time.

The next electrification work was part of the 1974 West Coast Main Line electrification project when the Hamilton Circle was electrified. This layout was retained when the Argyle Line opened in 1979.

Following the closure of adjacent (to the south) steel works and East Coast Main Line electrification, the junction layout was revised in 1990/91 to allow Fast Line trains to pass through at higher speeds. It was as a result of these revisions that single lead junctions from the Kirkhill and Cambuslang directions were installed, that contributed to the Newton rail crash. After several months a double line link was reinstated from Kirkhill.

Services

1979 
Following the opening of the Argyle Line there were three Hamilton circle trains in each way per hour (anti-clockwise - Hamilton then ; clockwise -  then ) and four trains per hour via Kirkhill to Glasgow Central (two via  and two via .  trains ran non-stop on the adjacent Fast lines.

2006/07 

On the Cathcart Circle, a half-hourly service operates from Newton every day. One journey per hour goes via  and the other via .

2013-14 

The service on the Hamilton Circle line remains the same, with trains heading southbound to Motherwell every half-hour (and hourly onwards to Lanark) and northbound to Milngavie.  A limited number of peak trains run to/from  via .

Services on the  line normally do not call here, save for a few peak period trains. On Sundays the Balloch to Motherwell via Hamilton trains call half-hourly.

Services on the Cathcart Circle line start & terminate here, with trains running every half-hour to/from Central High Level (including Sundays) alternately via Mount Florida & via . Additional services run during weekday peak periods.

2014-15 

The December 2014 timetable change has seen significant alterations to Argyle Line services through the station.  Trains to Motherwell still run every half-hour via Hamilton, but alternate services now continue to Cumbernauld via Whifflet rather than Lanark.  Also all Larkhall branch trains now call in each direction, giving four departures per hour northbound - these all now run to Dalmuir (alternately via Clydebank & via Singer) rather than Milngavie (passengers must change at Rutherglen or Partick for the latter).

On Sundays, the Motherwell services now run to/from Milngavie every 30 minutes and there is an hourly service calling each way on the Larkhall to Balloch route.

The service pattern on the Cathcart Circle line remains unchanged, with two trains per hour (plus peak extras) to/from Central High Level alternating via Queen's Park & Maxwell Park (including Sundays).

2016 

Further changes to the timetable have seen direct services to Milngavie reinstated (these run to/from Larkhall every 30 minutes throughout the day).  The service pattern otherwise remains unchanged.

References

Notes

Sources

External links

Newton, Railscot

Railway stations in South Lanarkshire
Former Caledonian Railway stations
Railway stations in Great Britain opened in 1849
Railway stations in Great Britain closed in 1873
Railway stations in Great Britain opened in 1873
SPT railway stations
Railway stations served by ScotRail
Buildings and structures in Cambuslang
1849 establishments in Scotland